The Siemens SL10 is a sliding mobile phone with a four-color screen (red, green, blue, and white).  It was the second mobile phone with a multicolor screen after the Siemens S10 and the first sliding mobile phone. 

SL10
Mobile phones with infrared transmitter